Lago di Ganna is a lake at Valganna in the Province of Varese, Lombardy, Italy.

It has an area of 0,07 km² and a maximum depth of 3 m. It is part of a natural reserve.

Geography 
It is located in the comune of Valganna. 

The lake has as an underground tributary the river Margorabbia, which than becomes an emissary that flows into the near Lago di Ghirla.

It is entirely part of the frazione of Ganna and it's comprised in the Cinque Vette Park.

History 
Between the XII and XIII centuries the benedictine monks changed the hydrography through some reclamation works.

In 1984 the lake became the center of the Natural Reserve of the Lake Ganna.

Fauna 
The population in Lake Ganna is mainly represented by pikes and tenches.

Ganna
Province of Varese